La Ferté-Vidame is a commune in the Eure-et-Loir department in northern France.

History
The title of vidame of Chartres was, under the Ancien Régime, attached to the lands of [La] Ferté-Arnault. Among the famous men to bear the title Vidame de Chartres were François de Vendôme, Vidame de Chartres, the English soldier Thomas de Scales, 7th Baron Scales (d. 1460), Jean de Ferrieres, and the memoirist Louis de Rouvroy, duc de Saint-Simon. The château was Saint-Simon's main country house. Until shortly before the French Revolution the seigneur was Jean-Joseph de Laborde, an ennobled business man with progressive views, who was to be guillotined in 1794.

In July 2019 a collector’s gathering was held at La Ferté for Citroën to mark the company's 100th anniversary. The event spread over one weekend and showed over 8,000 cars with nearly 100,000 people in attendance.

Castle

The Château de la Ferté-Vidame was substantially rebuilt by the architect Antoine Matthieu Le Carpentier in 1771. It is now a roofless shell.

At the Bourbon Restoration, it was restituted to the duchess of Orléans, as the closest relative of her father Louis Jean Marie de Bourbon, Duke of Penthièvre, the owner before the French Revolution. On her death in 1821, the domaine passed to her eldest son Louis-Philippe I, future king of the French.  He reconstituted the domaine, rebuilt its fortified wall, repaired its water features and restored and expanded the small château, though the restoration was interrupted by the Revolution of 1848.

Population

See also
Natural region of Thymerais
List of châteaux in Eure-et-Loir
Communes of the Eure-et-Loir department

References

Communes of Eure-et-Loir
Perche